Vellai Subbaiah was an Indian actor who had appeared in more than 500 films and 1000 stage plays. He featured mostly in comedy roles and also minor roles.  He is well known for his dialogue, "Thirumba Thirumba pesura nee..." in the movie Nesam Pudhusu (1999).

Early life 
He was born in Punjai Puliampatti village of Coimbatore in 1937.He ran away  from school at a young age because he wasn't interested in education. He was interested to act in plays. Then he met anthiyur drama troupe owner for getting chance to act in plays.

Film career 
He went to madras to act cinema. His first film was the hugely successful Silver Jubilee film Pasamalar he did uncredit cameo role. He got cinema opportunity given by Santo Chinnappa Thevar. His debut movie was Manavan released in the year of 1970.Though, he has acted in many films, but, he has been recognized to many people by the song "Megam Karukkaiyile" in the music of Ilaiyaraaja music.

Family 
Vellai Subbaiah's wife is Savitri. Their only daughter is Dhanalakshmi. she is married and has family in Kuwait.

Death 
He had been living in Sivanpuram, Coimbatore for the past 5 years. he had been ill for the last one week and was receiving treatment. He died on 6 September 2017.

Filmography

References

2017 deaths
1937 births
Tamil male actors